Emely Telle (born 9 January 1997) is a German former Paralympic swimmer who competed at international swimming competitions. She is a two-time World silver medalist and European silver medalist in the breaststroke. She also competed at the 2016 Summer Paralympics where she finished in eighth and ninth place in the 50m freestyle S12 and 100m breaststroke SB13 respectively.

References

External links
 
 

1997 births
Living people
German female breaststroke swimmers
German female freestyle swimmers
Paralympic swimmers of Germany
Swimmers at the 2016 Summer Paralympics
Medalists at the World Para Swimming Championships
Medalists at the World Para Swimming European Championships
S12-classified Paralympic swimmers
20th-century German women
21st-century German women
Sportspeople from Weimar